William Awihilima Kahaialiʻi (October 17, 1960 – May 18, 2020), known as Willie K, was a Hawaiian musician who performed in a variety of styles, including blues, rock, opera and Hawaiian music.

Early life
Born and raised in a family of musicians in Lahaina, Hawaii, Willie began performing at the age of 8 alongside his father, Hawaiian jazz guitarist Manu Kahaialiʻi.

Career
In 1993, Willie began a collaboration with Amy Hānaialiʻi Gilliom that would last for nine years. The pair recorded, performed, and toured together, and also shared a personal relationship. Their recordings won seven Na Hoku Hanohano Awards, part of Willie's total of 19 Hokus as a musician and producer.

In 2005, Willie's reunion album with Gilliom, Amy & Willie Live, was nominated for a Grammy in the first year of the Best Hawaiian Music Album award.

In 2007, Willie K became one of very few artists to win a Hoku as part of three different acts – his collaboration with Eric Gilliom won Best Contemporary Hawaiian Album, in addition to wins already achieved with Amy and as a solo artist.

Cancer and death
In February 2018, Willie K was diagnosed with lung cancer and promptly cancelled upcoming performances in Honolulu. In April 2019, Willie announced via his Facebook page that he was undergoing immunotherapy.

In January 2020, in a video posted to Facebook, Willie announced that his cancer was at the terminal stage. He made the video after a concert at Blue Note Hawaii in Waikiki. He stated that his "spirits remained high during the concert," which was supposed to be only a 90-minute set, but lasted for two hours. "The crowd deserved it," he said.

Willie K died at age 59 on May 18, 2020.

References

External links 
Official site
 

1960 births
2020 deaths
People from Lahaina, Hawaii
Mountain Apple Company artists
Singers from Hawaii
Native Hawaiian people
Na Hoku Hanohano Award winners
Deaths from lung cancer
Deaths from cancer in Hawaii
Native Hawaiian musicians